United Nations Security Council resolution 845, adopted unanimously on 18 June 1993, after recalling Resolution 817 (1993) and considering the secretary-General's report pursuant to it, the council urged both Greece and the Republic of Macedonia to continue efforts to settle the naming dispute.

The efforts of the co-chairmen of the Steering Committee of the International Conference on the Former Yugoslavia were appreciated, while the Secretary-General Boutros Boutros-Ghali was requested to keep the Security Council regularly updated, with the aim of settling the issue before the 48th session of the General Assembly in September 1993.

See also
 Foreign relations of the Republic of Macedonia
 List of United Nations Security Council Resolutions 801 to 900 (1993–1994)
 Macedonia (terminology)

References

External links
 
Text of the Resolution at undocs.org

 0845
1993 in the Republic of Macedonia
1993 in Greece
 0845
 0845
Greece–North Macedonia relations
1990s in Greek politics
June 1993 events